Laurence T. Fessenden (born March 23, 1963) is an American actor, producer, writer, director, film editor, and cinematographer. He is the founder of the New York based independent production outfit Glass Eye Pix. His writer/director credits include No Telling (written with Beck Underwood, 1991), Habit (1997), Wendigo (2001), and The Last Winter (written with Robert Leaver, 2006), which is in the permanent collection of the Museum of Modern Art. He has also directed the television feature Beneath (2013), an episode of the NBC TV series Fear Itself (2008) entitled "Skin and Bones", and a segment of the anthology horror-comedy film The ABCs of Death 2 (2014). He is the writer, with Graham Reznick, of the BAFTA Award-winning Sony PlayStation video game Until Dawn. He has acted in numerous films including Like Me (2017), In a Valley of Violence (2016), We Are Still Here (2015), Jug Face (2012), Broken Flowers (2005), The Dead Don't Die (2019), Bringing Out the Dead (1999) and I Sell the Dead (2009).

Personal life
Fessenden was born in New York City, New York. He attended St. Bernard's School, then Phillips Academy, from which he was expelled. He is married to Beck Underwood and the couple have one child.

Career
Fessenden has operated the production company Glass Eye Pix since 1985. Fessenden regards the old Universal Monsters as a substantial influence for him. In a review of Fessenden's film Wendigo (2001), Dave Kehr of the New York Times stated, "The independent filmmaker Larry Fessenden has set himself a challenging project: to approach the themes and thrills of the classic American horror movies through a determinedly modern approach, as if John Cassavetes had been working for Universal in the early 30s."

As an actor, screenwriter, director and film editor, he has worked, in addition to feature films, on such television projects as the NBC horror anthology Fear Itself (2008), directing the episode "Skin and Bones". He wrote the screenplay of  Orphanage (2007) with Guillermo del Toro, an English-language remake of El Orfanato.

Fessenden has worked as a mentor to young directors, such as Jim Mickle and Ti West. He has been a producer on projects including Ilya Chaiken's Liberty Kid (2007), Kelly Reichardt's Wendy and Lucy (2008), James McKenney's Satan Hates You (2010), West's The House of the Devil (2009) and The Innkeepers (2011), Joe Maggio's The Last Rites of Joe May (2011), and Rick Alverson's The Comedy (2012). Under his low-budget horror banner ScareFlix, Fessenden has produced films including West's The Roost (2005) and Trigger Man (2007), Glenn McQuaid's I Sell the Dead (2008), Maggio's Bitter Feast (2010), and Mickle's Stake Land (2010). More recently he has produced for prolific horror auteur Mickey Keating with Darling (2015) and Psychopaths (2017).

As a character actor, Fessenden has appeared in numerous films, including Martin Scorsese's Bringing Out the Dead (1999), Steve Buscemi's Animal Factory (2000), Brad Anderson's Session 9 (2001) and Vanishing on 7th Street (2010), Jim Jarmusch's Broken Flowers (2005), Neil Jordan's The Brave One (2007), McQuaid's I Sell the Dead (2008) for which he won best actor at the Slamdance Film Festival; Reichardt's Wendy and Lucy (2008), Mickle's Mulberry Street (2006) and Stake Land (2010), Joe Swanberg's All the Light in the Sky (2011), and Ted Geoghegan's We Are Still Here. Fessenden also starred in the Sundance Film Festival picture River of Grass (1994), which was Reichardt's debut feature, and Margarita Happy Hour (2001) directed by Chaiken. He has appeared on television in Louie, The Strain, and as himself in National Geographic's Brain Games.

In 2010, Fessenden partnered with Glenn McQuaid to launch Tales from Beyond the Pale, a series of macabre audio dramas  now available as a 47 episode podcast. In 2011, he released his third rock album with the band Just Desserts, an on-going partnership with songwriter Tom Laverack.  In 2012, he executive produced and was interviewed in the documentary Birth of the Living Dead, which examines the legacy of Night of the Living Dead.  In 2016, he produced, acted, and served as cinematographer in his son Jack's feature debut, Stray Bullets. The same year also saw Fessenden release a book titled, Sudden Storm, A Wendigo Reader.

Fessenden has also established a strong presence in the video game world. In 2015, he and Graham Reznick collaborated on writing the video game Until Dawn. Fessenden also played the role of a mysterious stranger armed with a flamethrower in the game itself. The game earned positive reviews and would go on to receive the "Original Property" award in the 2016 BAFTA Games Awards. Fessenden and Reznick also set a Guinness World Record for "Longest script for a graphic adventure videogame," with their script reaching 1,000 pages. The two writers would team up again in 2016 to develop a spin-off game known as Until Dawn: Rush of Blood, and later in 2018 for the Until Dawn prequel, The Inpatient.

Fessenden has run the company Glass Eye Pix since 1985 with the mission of "supporting individual voices in the arts." Glass Eye Pix continues to nurture young talent, most recently producing the debut features of Robert Mocker (Like Me, starring Addison Timlin and Fessenden), Ana Asensio (Most Beautiful Island), and Jenn Wexler (The Ranger).
 
Fessenden's Frankenstein-themed feature, Depraved, which he wrote, directed, edited and produced, was released on Friday the 13th of September, 2019 through IFC Midnight.

Awards and honors

Awards
Won – 1997 Independent Spirit Award Someone to Watch Award (Habit)
Nominated – 1997 Independent Spirit Award for Best Director (Habit)
Nominated – 1997 Austin Film Festival Award for Best Feature Film (Habit)
Won – 1999 Williamsburg Brooklyn Film Festival Audience Award for Feature Film (Habit)
Won – 1999 Williamsburg Brooklyn Film Festival Award for Best Editing (Habit)
Won – 1999 Williamsburg Brooklyn Film Festival Award for Best Actor (Habit)
Won – 2001 Woodstock Film Festival Jury Prize for Best Feature Film (Wendigo)
Nominated – 2003 Fangoria Chainsaw Award for Best Screenplay (Wendigo)
Won – 2007 Sitges Film Festival Maria Honorary Award (Himself)
Nominated – 2009 Independent Spirit Award for Best Feature Film (Wendy and Lucy)
Won – 2009 AFI Award for Movie of the Year (Wendy and Lucy)
Nominated – 2010 Piaget Spirit Award for Producing (Himself)
Won – 2010 Slamdance Special Jury Mention for Best Performance (I Sell the Dead) 
Nominated – 2010 Independent Spirit Award Producers Award (I Sell the Dead and The House of the Devil)
Won – 2011 Chlotrudis Award for Career So Far (Himself)
Nominated – 2014 Chicago International Film Festival Audience Choice Award (The ABCs of Death 2)
Nominated – 2015 Fright Meter Award for Best Supporting Actor (We Are Still Here) 
Nominated – 2016 Fangoria Chainsaw Award for Best Supporting Actor (We Are Still Here)
Won – 2016 BAFTA Games Award for Original Property (Until Dawn)
Won – 2017 Develop Award for Best Performance (Until Dawn: Rush of Blood)

Honors
2011 – Inducted into the Fangoria Hall of Fame
2011 – Total Film Icon of Horror at the London FrightFest Film Festival

Filmography

As actor

As writer

As director

As producer

See also
Antidote Films
Jeff Levy-Hinte

References

External links

Glass Eye Pix

1963 births
Living people
American male film actors
American film editors
American male screenwriters
American cinematographers
Male actors from New York City
St. Bernard's School alumni
Phillips Academy alumni
Film directors from New York City
Screenwriters from New York (state)